Milad-E-Sherief Memorial College, Kayamkulam, is a general degree college, affiliated under University of Kerala. The college is located in Kayamkulam, Alappuzha district, Kerala. It was established in 1964 by Al-Haj P. K. Kunju Sahib. This college has graduate and post-graduate courses in arts, commerce and science.

About 
The college was founded by late Al-Haj P.K.Kunju Sahib for the uneducated people of central Travancore. MSM, Milad-E-Sherief Memorial is a reminiscent of Milad-E-Sherief means the birthday of Muhammad. A monument to Muhammad being a religious taboo to Islam, a monument to the birthday of Muhammad was contemplated.

Founder 
MSM College is the brainchild of Al Haj P K Kunju Sahib, who had been the finance minister of Kerala State from 1967 to 1969. He envisioned that the progress of the poor and the downtrodden is possible only through education. Hence he undertook the great mission of imparting the radiance of knowledge to all, especially to the marginalised, to whom the college was established in 1964. He continues to enthuse the MSM fraternity for relentless pursuits to scale heights of excellence.

Departments

Science
Physics
Chemistry
Mathematics
Statistics
Botany
 Biotechnology
Zoology

Arts and Commerce
Malayalam
English Language and Literature
English and Communicative English
Arbic
History
Political Science
Economics
B.Com (finance)
B.Com (Corporation)

Accreditation
 The college is  recognized by the University Grants Commission (UGC).

Notable alumni
 C. S. Sujatha, Ex- Member of Parliament
Resul Pookutty,Oscar award winner

References

External links
http://www.msmcollege.in

Universities and colleges in Alappuzha district
Educational institutions established in 1964
1964 establishments in Kerala
Arts and Science colleges in Kerala
Colleges affiliated to the University of Kerala